David Geisinger (1790 – 5 March 1860) was an officer of the United States Navy, who served during the War of 1812, and was later Commodore of the East India Squadron.

Biography
Geisinger was born in Maryland in 1790 and was appointed midshipman in the United States Navy, on 15 November 1809. During the War of 1812, he was on board the sloop-of-war . On 21 September 1814, an eight-gun merchant brig, the Atalanta, ran afoul of Wasp, and was captured. Deemed too valuable to destroy, Atalanta was placed under the command of Midshipman Geisinger and was sent home to the United States. Geisinger arrived at Savannah, Georgia, safely on 4 November 1814. His good fortune was to escape from the fate of the Wasp, which was lost with all on board. He was promoted to lieutenant on 9 December 1814.

In March 1829, Geisinger was promoted to a commander.

Geisinger was promoted to captain on 24 May 1838. He commanded the East India Squadron from 1848 to 1850 as a Commodore. Glynn arrived on April 17, 1849, and insistently demanded the release of the prisoners, and threatened an intervention of the United States. With some help from the Dutch in the negotiations, the prisoners were finally delivered to him on April 26. He was the first American to negotiate successfully with Japan.

Geisinger's last assignment was at the Philadelphia Naval Asylum. He was placed on the retired list on September 13, 1855, and died in Philadelphia on March 5, 1860.

References 

1790 births
1860 deaths
People from Maryland
United States Navy commodores
United States Navy personnel of the War of 1812